Parliamentary elections were held in Serbia on 31 May 1893. They were held following a coup d'état by King Alexander in April, which removed the Liberal government which had remained in power following the March 1893 elections. The People's Radical Party won a large majority.

Results

References

Parliamentary 2
Serbia
1893 05
Serbia